Anjochiku Kibonooka Gymnasium is an arena in Anjo, Aichi, Japan. It is the home arena of the Aisin Areions of the B.League, Japan's professional basketball league.

Facilities
 Main arena -

References

Basketball venues in Japan
Sports venues in Aichi Prefecture
Anjō, Aichi
Aisin AW Areions Anjo